Ovie Clark Fisher (November 22, 1903 – December 9, 1994) was an attorney and author who served for 32 years as the U.S. representative for Texas's 21st congressional district.

Early life
Fisher was born in Junction in Kimble County, Texas to Jobe Bazilee and Rhoda Catherine Clark Fisher.  He married Marian E. De Walsh on September 11, 1927. A daughter named Rhoda was the couple's only child.

Fisher attended University of Texas at Austin, University of Colorado at Boulder, and Baylor University at Waco, from which he received his LL.B. He was admitted to the bar in 1929.

Career
Fisher practiced law in San Angelo in West Texas for two years. In 1931, he was elected county attorney for Tom Green County.

Fisher represented the 53rd District of Texas in the Texas House of Representatives from 1935 to 1937. From 1937 to 1943, Fisher was District Attorney for the 51st Judicial District of Texas.

In 1942, he was elected to the United States House of Representatives as a Democrat and served in the 78th Congress to the 93rd Congress. In 1972, the Republican Doug Harlan held Fisher to 57 percent of the general election vote. Paul Burka of Texas Monthly said Harlan's success was "one of the first indications that the dominance of the rural conservative Democrats in Texas politics could not be sustained."

Fisher was one of five U.S. representatives from Texas to sign the "Southern Manifesto" in protest of the US Supreme Court's decision in Brown v. Board of Education.

After heart surgery in 1973, Fisher announced that he would not be stand for re-election in 1974. His party nominated Robert Krueger as his successor, who defeated Harlan, who made his second and last race for Congress.

Fisher died on December 9, 1994.

Legacy
Baylor University is the repository for the O.C. Fisher Papers.

In 1975, San Angelo Lake, a reservoir managed by the United States Army Corps of Engineers was renamed O.C. Fisher Reservoir in his honor. San Angelo State Park is on the shores of the reservoir.

Fraternal memberships

Fisher had membership in the following organizations:

Freemasons
Order of the Eastern Star
Knights of Pythias
Rotary International
Acacia fraternity

Works

References

Sources

1903 births
1994 deaths
People from Junction, Texas
People from San Angelo, Texas
University of Colorado alumni
University of Texas at Austin alumni
Baylor University alumni
County district attorneys in Texas
Democratic Party members of the Texas House of Representatives
Democratic Party members of the United States House of Representatives from Texas
20th-century American historians
American male non-fiction writers
20th-century American politicians
Historians from Texas
20th-century American male writers
American segregationists